Idalus aleteria is a moth of the family Erebidae. It was described by William Schaus in 1905. It is found in Costa Rica, French Guiana, Guyana, Peru, Bolivia and Trinidad.

References

 

aleteria
Moths described in 1905